William Nelson Cromwell (January 17, 1854 – July 19, 1948) was an American attorney active in promotion of the Panama Canal and other major ventures especially in cooperation with Philippe Bunau-Varilla.

Life and career 

He was born and raised in Brooklyn, New York, in an Episcopalian household, by his mother, Sarah M. Brokaw, a Civil War widow. His father, John Nelson Cromwell, died in the Battle of Vicksburg.

He worked as an accountant for the attorney Algernon Sydney Sullivan, who paid for his education at Columbia Law School and made him a partner in Sullivan & Cromwell in 1879.  In 1898 the chief of the French Canal Syndicate (a group that owned large swathes of land across Panama), Philippe Bunau-Varilla, hired him to lobby the US Congress to build a canal across Panama, and not across Nicaragua, as rivals would have it. Cromwell showed that Nicaragua had an active volcano. On June 19, 1902, three days after senators received stamps showing volcanic activity in Nicaragua they voted for the Panama route for the canal. For his lobbying efforts, he received the sum of $800,000. (about  million USD today). After the Hay–Bunau-Varilla Treaty was ratified, Cromwell was paid another $2,000,000 (about  million USD today) – at the time, the highest amount ever paid to a lawyer.

By 1907, he was a member of the Consolidated Stock Exchange of New York, one of around 13,000.

One of his main pro bono activities was helping the blind. Another was the founding of "the Society of Friends of Roumania" in 1920 under the patronage of Her Majesty Queen Marie of Romania. Under his tutelage, the New York-based Society promoted numerous exchanges between the two countries and published the distinguished Roumania – A Quarterly Review.

References

Further reading 
 Ameringer, Charles D. "The Panama Canal Lobby of Philippe Bunau-Varilla and William Nelson Cromwell." American Historical Review 68.2 (1963): 346–363.  online
 Dean, Arthur H. William Nelson Cromwell, 1854-1948: An American Pioneer in Corporation, Comparative and International Law(Ad Press, 1957).
 
 Diaz-Espino, Ovidio E. "How Wall Street Created a Nation: J.P. Morgan, Teddy Roosevelt and the Panama Canal." (Basic Books, 2001). .

External links 
 

1854 births
1948 deaths
Columbia Law School alumni
New York (state) lawyers
People from Brooklyn
New York (state) Republicans
19th-century American businesspeople
Sullivan & Cromwell partners
Burials at Woodlawn Cemetery (Bronx, New York)